The Einsatzgruppen Operational Situation Reports (OSRs), or ERM for the  (plural: Ereignismeldungen), were dispatches of the Nazi death squads (Einsatzgruppen), which documented the progress of the Holocaust behind the German-Soviet frontier in the course of Operation Barbarossa, during World War II. The extant reports were sent between June 1941 and April 1942 to the Chief of the Security Police and the SD in Berlin, from the occupied eastern territories including modern-day Poland, Belarus, Ukraine, Russia, Moldova, and the Baltic Countries. During the Nuremberg War Crimes Trials the originals were grouped according to year and month and catalogued using a consecutive numbering system, as listed in the below table. The original photostats are held at the National Archives in Washington D.C.

Background

Following the onset of Operation Barbarossa, during the first 5 weeks of their shooting actions, the Einsatzgruppen squads targeted primarily male Jews. This changed on July 29, 1941, when Reinhard Heydrich himself, quoted at an SS meeting in Vileyka (Polish Wilejka), criticized their leaders for the low execution figures. It was therefore ordered that the Jewish women and children be included in all subsequent shooting operations. The first women and children were killed along with the men on July 30, 1941, in Vileyka.

The Nazi Einsatzgruppen were not the only formation tasked with the mass killings. Other formations included the Order Police battalions from Germany (Orpo) participating equally in the mass murder of Polish and Soviet Jews regardless of their age and sex, including in the territories of the formerly Soviet-occupied Poland (see the Red Friday massacre), the Baltic states, and in the USSR proper. Significant numbers of women and children were murdered behind all front lines not only by the Germans but also by the local Ukrainian and Lithuanian auxiliary forces. The largest mass shooting of Soviet Jews took place on September 29, 1941, in the ravine of Babi Yar near Kiev, where 33,771 Jews of all ages were machine-gunned (Situation Report No. 101).

Original German cables
After World War II, the reports were grouped and numbered by the Allies in order to summarize their content. The actual German cables were sent in their own differing sequence including by the Einsatzgruppe A (EG–A) attached to Army Group North, Einsatzgruppe B (EG–B) attached to Army Group Center, Einsatzgruppe C (EG-C) attached to the Army Group South, and Einsatzgruppe D (EG–D) attached to the 11th Army. In the OSRs, individual Ereignismeldungen UdSSR (morning reports) abbr. EM, from EG–A appear in 103 different places. The reports from EG–B appear in 64 OCRs (as arranged by the Allies). The EG-C reports are listed in 77 different OCRs, and the reports from EG–D (with the least representation at source) are featured in 63 OCRs. Occasionally, large gaps appear between individual reports, caused by the lack of time or other complications including broken telephone lines in the East. Notably, in Operational Situation Report number 19, Einsatzgruppe C was changed to Einsatzgruppe B and vice versa, thus confusing further reports of their shooting actions.

The OSRs are far from being equal. Some of them, such as OSR 156, include translated cables from several cities and weeks of shooting actions not yet concluded with tens of thousands of victims mentioned; while other Operational Situation Reports, such as OSR 67, resemble long essays describing mere investigations into partisan activities in rural countryside resulting in dozens of executions. Notably, the reports do not include all killings before the end of 1942.

The following selection of reports are available in English translation.  The complete set of reports is available in German.

See also

 Einsatzgruppen  
 Einsatzkommando
 Gerstein Report, 1945
 Höfle Telegram, 1943
 Jäger Report, 1941
 Katzmann Report, 1943
 Korherr Report, 1943
 Riegner Telegram, 1942
 Special Prosecution Book-Poland, 1937–1939

Notes

References

 Newer edition by Univ. of Nebraska Press / Yad Vashem 2007.
 
 

 
Holocaust historical documents
The Holocaust in Latvia
The Holocaust in Ukraine
The Holocaust in Lithuania
The Holocaust in Russia
The Holocaust in Estonia
The Holocaust in Belarus
The Holocaust in Poland
1941 documents
1942 documents